Alipurduar Junction is one of the four railway stations that serve Alipurduar city in Alipurduar district in north Bengal in the Indian state of West Bengal. Its station code is APDJ and it lies in New Jalpaiguri–Alipurduar–Samuktala Road line and Alipurduar–Bamanhat branch line.

Trains
The major trains operated by this station are:

Originating Trains
Sealdah-Alipurduar Kanchan Kanya Express
Alipurduar - Secunderabad Express
Delhi Junction-Alipurduar Sikkim Mahananda Express
Alipurduar–Silghat Town Rajya Rani Express
Alipurduar–Lumding Intercity Express
Alipurduar–Kamakhya Intercity Express
Siliguri–Alipurduar Intercity Express
New Jalpaiguri–Alipurduar Tourist Special

Halting Trains

Puri–Kamakhya Weekly Express (via Howrah)
Dr. Ambedkar Nagar–Kamakhya Express
Kamakhya–Anand Vihar Express
Kamakhya-Patna Capital Express
Lokmanya Tilak Terminus–Kamakhya Karmabhoomi Express.
Dibrugarh–Kanyakumari Vivek Express
Jhajha–Dibrugarh Weekly Express
Udaipur City–Kamakhya Kavi Guru Express
Ranchi–Kamakhya Express
New Tinsukia–Bengaluru Weekly Express
 Siliguri Bamanhat Intercity Express

History
The Cooch Behar State Railway built a  narrow-gauge railway from Geetaldaha on the Eastern Bengal Railway to Jainti in 1901. The line passed through Alipurduar. It was converted to  metre gauge in 1910.

With the partition of India in 1947, railway links of Assam and the Indian part of North Bengal, earlier passing through the eastern part of Bengal, were completely cut off from the rest of India. The Assam Rail Link project was taken up on 26 January 1948 to construct a   metre-gauge railway linking Fakiragram with Kishanganj in Bihar via Alipurduar. The first train ran on the route on 26 January 1950. The route was converted to  broad gauge in 2003–2006.

Now all the railway tracks in Alipurduar city are broad gauge.

Other adjacent stations
Two adjacent local railway stations are Alipurduar (station code APD) and Alipurduar Court (station code APDC). Long-distance trains do not stop there.

Most of the long-distance trains from other parts of India pass through and stop at New Alipurdur railway junction (station code NOQ) constructed in early 1950s as it is connected with double track to Assam and the rest of Bengal. The older Alipurduar station was on metre-gauge track that was converted to broad gauge much later in 2006 and fewer trains pass through Alipurduar station.

The two junctions are on different lines and only one short-distance train Alipurduar–Kamakhya InterCity Express (train number 15471) runs between the two junctions.

Northeast Frontier Railway converted the Alipurduar–Bamanhat branch line to  broad gauge in 2007.

References

External links
 Trains at Alipurduar Junction
 

Alipurduar railway division
Railway stations in Alipurduar district
Railway junction stations in West Bengal
Transport in Alipurduar